Federico Anthony Warner  (born November 19, 1996) is an American football middle linebacker for the San Francisco 49ers of the National Football League (NFL). He played college football at BYU and was drafted by the 49ers in the third round of the 2018 NFL Draft.

Early life and high school career
Federico Anthony Warner was born on November 19, 1996 in San Marcos, California to Laura and Fred Warner, the eldest of two sons and one daughter. He is half Mexican-American from his mother Laura's side, and half-African American and Panamanian from his father Fred's side. His parents separated when Warner was a toddler, and his mother raised him and his siblings as a single parent. After experimenting with different sports, Warner began playing football when he was seven, which both he and his mother have cited as helping to shape his teenage years by giving him a sense of community. Though he admired numerous Chargers players, Warner grew up as a fan of the Dallas Cowboys along with his father.

At Mission Hills High School, Warner played as a linebacker on the football team and became a starter his junior year with the varsity team, where he was recognized for his strengths as an outside linebacker and was subsequently named the All-San Diego Section Defensive Player of the Year. Warner was also named to the All-California First-team by USA Today and the Cal-Hi Sports All-State First-team and earned the title of Avocado East League Defensive Player of the Year.

Warner was raised in the Church of Jesus Christ of Latter-day Saints and after mentioning his football ambitions to his ward, a fellow ward member, who was a BYU alum, helped to get his highlight reel to Kelly Poppinga, who became his lead recruiter.

College career
As a true freshman for BYU, Warner registered 24 total tackles, one tackle for loss, one interception (which was returned for a touchdown) and one pass breakup. Warner stepped into the starting role as a sophomore, making 67 total tackles, 11.5 tackles for loss, four sacks, two interceptions and four fumble recoveries. As a junior, Warner recorded 86 total tackles, 10.5 tackles for loss, 1.5 sacks, three interceptions (returning one for a touchdown), two forced fumbles and six pass breakups. As a senior, Warner was named as the team captain and led the team with 87 total tackles, nine tackles for loss, one sack, along with one interception, one forced fumble, one fumble recovery and five pass breakups.

In four years at BYU, Warner was a three-year starter and registered 264 total tackles, 32 tackles for loss, 6.5 sacks, seven interceptions (returning two for touchdowns), five fumble recoveries, three forced fumbles and 13 pass breakups. His seven career interceptions rank second in school history among linebackers.

College statistics

Professional career
On November 20, 2017, it was announced that Warner had accepted his invitation to play in the 2018 Senior Bowl. On January 27, 2018, Warner recorded six combined tackles as part of Denver Broncos' head coach Vance Joseph's North team that lost 45–16 to the South coached by Houston Texans' head coach Bill O'Brien. His overall performance throughout the week impressed scouts and helped him add value to his draft stock. He attended the NFL Scouting Combine and completed all of the combine drills. He finished 13th among all linebackers in the 40-yard dash, eighth in the bench press, ninth in the short shuttle, and sixth in the three-cone drill. Warner attended pre-draft visits and private workouts with multiple teams, including the San Francisco 49ers, Denver Broncos, and Buffalo Bills. At the conclusion of the pre-draft process, Warner was projected to be a second round pick by the majority of NFL draft experts and scouts. He was ranked the fourth best outside linebacker in the draft by Scouts Inc. and was ranked the sixth best outside linebacker by DraftScout.com. 

The San Francisco 49ers selected Warner in the third round with the 70th overall pick in the 2018 NFL Draft. Warner was the ninth linebacker drafted in 2018.

2018 season
On June 13, 2018, the 49ers signed Warner to a four-year, 3.97 million contract that includes a signing bonus of $1.01 million. Throughout training camp, Warner competed against Brock Coyle to be the starting middle linebacker. Head coach Kyle Shanahan named Warner the starting middle linebacker to begin the season. He started alongside outside linebackers Mark Nzeocha and Malcolm Smith.

Warner made his NFL debut and first start in the season-opener against the Minnesota Vikings and recorded 12 combined tackles (11 solo tackles), one pass defended, and one forced fumble during a 24–16 road loss. In the regular-season finale, he collected a season-high 14 combined tackles (nine solo) in a 48–32 road loss to the Los Angeles Rams in Week 17. Warner started all 16 games during his rookie year and recorded 124 combined tackles (85 solo), six pass deflections, and one forced fumble. Warner’s 124 total tackles finished 12th among all players and third among all rookies in 2018.

2019 season

Warner announced he would change his number from 48 to 54 for the 2019 season, after the departure of Cassius Marsh. In Week 10 against the Seattle Seahawks on Monday Night Football, Warner recorded a team high 10 tackles, sacked Russell Wilson twice, and forced a fumble on offensive tackle Germain Ifedi which was recovered by teammate DeForest Buckner for a 12 yard touchdown in a 27–24 overtime loss. Two weeks later, Warner recorded 11 tackles, a tackle for loss, and strip-sacked Aaron Rodgers in a 37–8 victory over the Green Bay Packers, earning NFC Defensive Player of the Week honors. Warner was named the NFC Defensive Player of the Month for his play in November. During Week 16 against the Los Angeles Rams, Warner recorded 11 tackles and an interception off a pass thrown by Jared Goff which he returned for a 46-yard touchdown in a narrow 34–31 victory. During Super Bowl LIV against the Kansas City Chiefs, Warner recorded seven tackles and intercepted a pass thrown by Patrick Mahomes during the 31–20 loss. He was ranked as #70 by his peers on the NFL Top 100 Players of 2020.

2020 season
Warner was placed on the COVID-19 reserved list by the team on August 31, 2020, before he was activated on September 9, 2020.

In Week 3 against the New York Giants, Warner recorded his first interception of the season during the 36–9 win. In Week 16, Warner racked up 14 tackles, three passes defended, a forced fumble and a fumble recovery in a 20–12 win over the Arizona Cardinals, earning NFC Defensive Player of the Week.
In Week 17 against the Seattle Seahawks, Warner led the team with 10 tackles and recorded his first sack of the season on Russell Wilson during the 26–23 loss.  The season culminated in Warner earning his first Pro Bowl selection, and first ever honor as AP First-team All-Pro.

2021 season
On July 21, 2021, Warner signed a record-breaking five-year extension with the 49ers worth $95 million along with $40.5 million guaranteed.

NFL career statistics

Regular season

Postseason

Personal life
In December 2017, Warner graduated with a degree in exercise and wellness from BYU.

Warner's younger brother, Troy, followed him to BYU in 2015 as a defensive back and is currently a member of the Tampa Bay Buccaneers practice squad.

Warner married former The Bachelor contestant Sydney Hightower on June 25, 2022.

References

External links
 BYU Cougars bio
 San Francisco 49ers bio

1996 births
Living people
American football linebackers
BYU Cougars football players
People from San Marcos, California
Players of American football from California
San Francisco 49ers players
Sportspeople from San Diego County, California
National Conference Pro Bowl players